The Kashgar (or Kaxgar, in its upper course Kyzylsuu,) is a river in the Xinjiang province of the People's Republic of China. It has its sources in the eastern parts of the Pamir Mountains, notably the Alay Valley, in the border area between China and Kyrgyzstan, and then flows eastwards, through the Erkeshtam pass passing through the city of Kashgar, which gets its name from the river. The river then flows into the northwestern parts of the Taklamakan desert, to its confluence with the Yarkand River.  One of the tributaries of the Kashgar is the Ma'erkansu River.

Rivers of Xinjiang
Tarim basin
Tributaries of the Tarim